Qush Qayahsi or Qush Qayehsi may refer to:
 Qush Qayahsi, Kaleybar
 Qush Qayehsi, Malekan
 Qush Qayehsi, Maragheh
 Qush Qayahsi, Marand